Christian Meier (born 1970) is a Peruvian actor and singer.

Christian Meier may also refer to:

 Christian Meier (historian) (born 1929), German historian
 Christian Meier (cyclist) (born 1985), Canadian racing cyclist

See also
 Meier
 Christian Meyer (disambiguation)
 Christian Mayer (disambiguation)